This is a list of teams playing American Football in Germany (Version: 2010):

NFL Europa

1st Bundesliga

GFL North 
 Berlin Rebels
 Berlin Adler
 Cologne Crocodiles
 Dresden Monarchs
 Hamburg Huskies
 Hildesheim Invaders
 Kiel Baltic Hurricanes
 New Yorker Lions

GFL South 
 Munich Cowboys
 Allgäu Comets
 Marburg Mercenaries
 Ingolstadt Dukes
 Saarland Hurricanes
 Samsung Frankfurt Universe
 Schwäbisch Hall Unicorns
 Stuttgart Scorpions

2nd Bundesliga

GFL 2 North 
 Assindia Cardinals
 Bonn Gamecocks
 Düsseldorf Panther
 Langenfeld Longhorns
 Lübeck Cougars
 Paderborn Dolphins
 Potsdam Royals
 Rostock Griffins

GFL 2 South 
 Albershausen Crusaders
 Fursty Razorbacks
 Gießen Golden Dragons
 Kirchdorf Wildcats
 Nurnberg Rams
 Ravensburg Razorbacks
 Wiesbaden Phantoms

Regionalliga

Regionalliga North

Group North 
 Hamburg Huskies
 Hamburg Blue Devils
 Norderstedt Nordic Wolves
 Kiel Baltic Hurricanes II
 St. Pauli Buccaneers

Group South 

 Osnabrück Tigers
 Hildesheim Invaders
 Göttingen Generals
 Arminia Spartans

Regionalliga East 

 Berlin Adler
 Frankfurt Red Cocks
 Cottbus Crayfish
 Leipzig Lions
 Tollense Sharks
 Potsdam Royals

Regionalliga West 
 Bochum Cadets
 Paderborn Dolphins
 Dortmund Giants
 Bielefeld Bulldogs
 Remscheid Amboss

Regionalliga Central

Group North 
 Frankfurt Universe
 Montabaur Fighting Farmers
 Jenaer Hanfrieds
 Frankfurt Pirates
 Giessen Golden Dragons

Group South 
 Stuttgart Silver Arrows
 Ravensburg Razorbacks
 Badener Greifs
 Freiburg Sacristans

Regionalliga South 

 Munich Cowboys II
 Munich Rangers
 Fursty Razorbacks
 Passau Pirates
 Burghausen Crusaders
 Würzburg Panthers
 Landsberg Express
 Nürnberg Rams

Oberliga

Oberliga Schleswig-Holstein/Hamburg 
 Elmshorn Fighting Pirates
 Hamburg Pioneers
 Lübeck Seals
 Hamburg Ravens
 Flensburg Sealords

Oberliga Niedersachsen/Bremen 
 Braunschweig Lions II
 Bremerhaven Seahawks
 Bremen Firebirds
 Hannover Grizzlies

Oberliga East 
 Chemnitz Crusaders
 Berlin Thunderbirds
 Spandau Bulldogs
 Rostock Griffins
 Wernigerode Mountain Tigers
 Radebeul Suburban Foxes

Oberliga NRW 
 Aachen Vampires
 Münster Mammuts
 Cologne Falcons II
 Düsseldorf Bulldozer
 Gelsenkirchen Devils
 Solingen Paladins

Oberliga Hessen/Rheinland-Pfalz/Saar/Thüringen 
 Bad Kreuznach Thunderbirds
 Heiligenstein Crusaders
 Kassel Titans
 Trier Stampers
 Nauheim Wild Boys
 Mainz Golden Eagles
 Erfurt Indigos

Oberliga Baden-Württemberg 
 Danube Hammers
 Crailsheim Titans
 Pforzheim Wilddogs
 Albershausen Crusaders
 Heidelberg Bulls
 Kuchen Mammuts
 Ludwigsburg Bulldogs

Bayernliga 
 Königsbrunn Ants
 Burghausen Crusaders
 München Rangers
 Straubing Spiders
 Ingolstadt Dukes
 Franken Timberwolves

Verbandsliga

Verbandsliga Schleswig-Holstein/Hamburg 
 Hamburg Black Swans
 Hamburg Blue Devils II
 Lübeck Cougars II
 Neumünster Castle Demons
 St. Pauli Buccaneers

Verbandsliga Niedersachsen/Bremen

Group North 
 Jade Bay Buccaneers
 Nienburg Country Taurus
 Ritterhude Badgers
 Zeven Northern United

Group South 
 Schaumburg Rangers
 Wolfenbüttel Black Wolves
 Wolfsburg Blue Wings
 Hannover Stampeders

Verbandsliga East 
 Eberswalder Warriors
 Capital Colts
 Berlin Bullets
 Erkner Razorbacks
 Halle Falken

Verbandsliga NRW 
 Ahlen/Hamm Aces
 Cologne Crocodiles
 Niederrhein Grizzlies
 Oberberg Bandits
 Sauerland Mustangs

Landesliga Central 
 Fulda Saints
 Koblenz Huskies
 Langen Knights
 Neuwied Raiders
 Wetzlar Wölfe

Verbandsliga Baden-Württemberg 
 Aalen Limes Praetorians
 Backnang Wolverines
 Bad Mergentheim Wolfpack
 Böblingen Bears
 Ostalb Highlanders
 Fellbach Warriors
 Heilbronn Salt Miners
 Pforzheim Panthers
  Heidelberg Hunters

Verbandsliga Bayern

Group North 
 Bamberg Bears
 Würzburg Panthers
 Erlangen Sharks
 Albertshofen Roughnecks
 Schweinfurt Ball Bearings

Group South 
 Augsburg Raptors
 Kümmerbruck Red Devils
 Landsberg X-press
 Rosenheim Rebels

Landesliga

Landesliga NRW - Group West 
 Aachen Düren Demons
 Düsseldorf Bulldozer
 Kleve Conquerors
 Kreis Heinsberg Bisons
 Mülheim Shamrocks
 Neuss Frogs

Landesliga NRW - Group East 
 Ahlen/Hamm Aces
 Bielefeld Bulldogs II
 Sauerland Mustangs
 Siegen Sentinels
 Solingen Paladins II
 Wipperfürth Phoenix
 Wuppertal Greyhounds

Landesliga Baden-Württemberg 
 Biberach Beavers
 Kornwestheim Cougars
 Rottenburg Red Knights
 Lahr Miners
 Schwäbisch Hall Unicorns II
 Rhein-Neckar Bandits II

References

!